The 1986–87 National Football League, known for sponsorship reasons as the Ford National Football League, was the 56th staging of the National Football League (NFL), an annual Gaelic football tournament for the Gaelic Athletic Association county teams of Ireland.

The quarter-final rounds were notable for the Dublin–Cork tie. After the game ended in a draw, Cork refused to play extra time and Dublin took the field unopposed, Barney Rock scoring a goal into an empty net before the referee awarded them victory (later chosen as one of the Top 20 GAA Moments). The Dubs went on to defeat Kerry in the final.

Format

Divisions
 Division One: 8 teams
 Division Two: 8 teams
 Division Three: 16 teams. Split into two regional groups of 8 (North and South)

Round-robin format
Each team played every other team in its division (or group where the division is split) once, either home or away.

Points awarded
2 points were awarded for a win and 1 for a draw.

Titles
Teams in all three divisions competed for the National Football League title.

Knockout stage qualifiers
 Division One: top 4 teams
 Division Two: top 2 teams
 Division Three (North):  group winners
 Division Three (South):  group winners

Knockout phase structure
In the quarter-finals, the match-ups were as follows:
 Quarter-final 1: First-placed team in Division One v First-placed team in Division Three (South)
 Quarter-final 2: Second-placed team in Division One v First-placed team in Division Three (North)
 Quarter-final 3: Third-placed team in Division One v Second-placed team in Division Two
 Quarter-final 4: Fourth-placed team in Division One v First-placed team in Division Two
The semi-final match-ups are:
 Semi-final 1: Winner Quarter-final 1 v Winner Quarter-final 4
 Semi-final 2: Winner Quarter-final 2 v Winner Quarter-final 3

The final match-up is: Winner Semi-final 1 v Winner Semi-final 2.

Promotion and relegation

 Division One: bottom 2 teams demoted to Division Two
 Division Two: top 2 teams promoted to Division One. Bottom 2 teams demoted to Division Three.
 Division Three (North): group winners promoted to Division Two. 
 Division Three (South):  group winners promoted to Division Two.

Separation of teams on equal points

In the event that teams finish on equal points, then a play-off will be used to determine group placings if necessary, i.e. where to decide relegation places or quarter-finalists.

League Phase Tables and Results

Division One

Play-Off

Table

Division Two

Division Three

Division Three (North) table

Division Three (South) table

Knockout stages

Quarter-finals

Cork refused to play extra time and so Dublin were awarded the game.

Semi-finals

Final

References

External links
 Cork Head For The Train: Dublin In semi final 1987 RTÉ archive footage of the "farcical end" to the Dublin–Cork semifinal

National Football League
National Football League
National Football League (Ireland) seasons